USS Owaissa (SP-659) was a United States Navy patrol vessel in commission from 1917 to 1919.

Owaissa was built as the private motorboat Marie by the New York Yacht, Launch & Engine Company at Morris Heights in the Bronx, New York, in 1912. She later was renamed Owaissa.

On 11 July 1917, the U.S. Navy acquired Owaissa under a free lease from her owner,  E. B. Dickerson, for use as a section patrol boat during World War I. She was commissioned as USS Owaissa (SP-659) on 6 November 1917.

Assigned to the 1st Naval District in northern New England, Owaissa carried out patrol duties for the rest of World War I. She initially patrolled around Woods Hole, Massachusetts, speaking to various vessels to determine their identities. She spent the summer of 1918 on outward patrol, working with the patrol boats USS Patrol No. 6 (SP-54), USS Rhebal (SP-1195), and USS Felicia (SP-642), the submarine chaser , and a patrol boat with the section patrol number SP-50 of which no records have been found. In August 1918 Owaissa began to patrol Vineyard Sound.

In December 1918, Owaissa proceeded to Newport, Rhode Island, then moved on to the New York Yacht Club dock. After decommissioning at the Material Section Dock, she was returned to Dickerson on 3 January 1919.

References

Department of the Navy Naval History and Heritage Command Online Library of Selected Images: Civilian Ships: Owaissa (American Motor Boat, 1912). Served as USS Owaissa (SP-659) in 1917-1919
NavSource Online: Section Patrol Craft Photo Archive Owaissa (SP 659)

Patrol vessels of the United States Navy
World War I patrol vessels of the United States
Ships built in Morris Heights, Bronx
1912 ships
Ships built by the New York Yacht, Launch & Engine Company